Megachile congruata is a species of bee in the family Megachilidae. It was described by Mitchell in 1943.

References

Congruata
Insects described in 1943